Okada Manila is a casino resort and hotel complex located on the Entertainment City gaming strip in Parañaque, Metro Manila, Philippines.
In 2007, with a total construction cost of about 250 billion Yen and spending 7 years, Japanese billionaire Kazuo Okada established and managed Okada Manila.

History

Tiger Resort Leisure and Entertainment was granted a license to operate a casino within the Entertainment City in 2008. In June 2016, the casino complex then named as Manila Bay Resorts was re-branded as Okada Manila.

The facility is intended to be used by Okada to compete with casinos in Macau and to position Metro Manila as a regional and international destination. The casino was set to open in November 2016 but the opening was later delayed due to worse-than-expected weather conditions.

The casino complex was opened for "preview" on December 21, 2016 and later commenced operations as a casino on December 30, 2016.

The Fountain, was officially opened on March 31, 2017, to invited guests. On the next day, the casino opened the attraction to the general public.

Kazuo Okada was removed as board chairman of Tiger Resort in 2017 after the Universal Entertainment Corporation its parent firm alleged he has misappropriate funds. Okada continue's to claim that he is the rightful head of Tiger Resort and filed legal charges against the board while the casino continued to operate.

The operations of the casino was significantly affected by the enhanced community quarantine in Luzon imposed due to the COVID-19 pandemic with 1,000 of its 10,000 staff members retrenched due in June 2020.

The Supreme Court, which issued a status quo ante order on April 27, 2022 compelling the Tiger Resort to revert to a state prior to Kazuo Okada's removal from its board in 2017. On May 31, 2022, Okada's group took over Okada Manila's operations.

Features
The hotel building of Okada Manila is composed of Pearl Wing and Coral Wing with each wing having 15 floors to be connected by two sky bridges. The glass facade of the building has a gold color representing the hue of Manila Bay's sunset, and is one of the casino's key themes. The US$2.4 billion phase one of the casino project includes 993 hotel rooms. More than 3,000 electronic gaming machines and 500 table games were planned to be installed in the casino complex.

Included in Okada Manila's amenities are The Retreat Spa, a full-service wellness center that offers luxury spa services; and PLAY, an indoor facility for the learning-oriented entertainment for kids. There is also an allotted  shopping area within the casino resort.

The Fountain
A large central fountain, dubbed as "The Fountain" is the centerpiece of the casino resort complex spanning  and costs US$30 million. The Fountain is dubbed as the largest multicolor dancing fountain in the world.

The US$30 million fountain was designed by Los Angeles-based firm, WET. The design was inspired from the "festive traditions of the Philippines", and the sampaguita (Jasminum sambac). The dancing fountain has 739 water nozzles which includes underwater robots which are proprietary of WET, 2,611 colored LED lights and 23 speakers.

The Fountain at Okada Manila is the largest dancing fountain in the Philippines. Measuring , the Okada Manila fountain is slightly smaller than The Dubai Fountain at the Burj Khalifa Lake in the United Arab Emirates.

The Garden 
The Garden is a lush open space overlooking Manila bay. It occupies more than 30,000 square meters of manicured greenery and features five reflective ponds covering over 3,000 square meters. The Garden serves as a relaxation area for guests, as well as a venue for celebrations and special events.

Cove Manila
Cove Manila is an indoor beach club during the day and a night club at night. 

Cove Manila opened to the public on December 15, 2017, with DJ Steve Aoki headlining the event. The venue already hosted an event prior to its opening which was the after-party event for Miss Universe 2016 which was held in January 2017. Miss Earth 2019 was held on October 26, 2019, Miss Earth 2022 was held on November 29, 2022 and Jillian Ward's debut was held on February 25, 2023.

See also
 Gambling in Metro Manila

References

External links

Casinos completed in 2016
Hotels established in 2016
Hotel buildings completed in 2016
Casinos in Metro Manila
Hotels in Metro Manila
Resorts in the Philippines
Buildings and structures in Parañaque
Tourist attractions in Metro Manila
2016 establishments in the Philippines
Casino hotels